The 2013 season was Landskrona BoIS's 98th in existence, their 51st season in the second highest division, their 10th season in Superettan and their 8th consecutive season in the league. They competed in Superettan and Svenska Cupen. The season began with the group stage of Svenska Cupen in March, and league play started in April and lasted until November. Jörgen Pettersson replaced Henrik Larsson as manager in December 2012, and Georg "Rossi" Eterovic replaced Hans Eklund as assistant manager. The captain this season was Linus Malmqvist, with Fredrik Svanbäck as vice captain.

Key events of the season
 16 November 2012: Jörgen Pettersson is announced as new head coach, with Georg "Rossi" Eterovic as assistant, which means that Henrik Larsson and Hans Eklund will leave the club.
 20 November 2012: Henrik Larsson and Hans Eklund makes their last training as coaches of the club.
 19 December 2012: Malmö FF players Alexander Nilsson and Tobias Malm is announced will join Landskrona on loan for the 2013 season.
 8 January 2013: Goalkeeper Bill Halvorsen joins the club from IFK Värnamo, and goalkeeper Ivo Vazgec leaves the club as free agent.
 1 February 2013: Midfielder Andreas Dahl joins the club, having previously played for Hammarby IF.
 9 February 2013: BoIS wins the first match of the pre-season against Falkenbergs FF with 4-0.
 6 April 2013: BoIS wins the first match of the 2013 Superettan against Degerfors IF at home with 1-0, with a goal scored by Amethyst Bradley Ralani.
 12 August 2013: For the third time in recently played matches, BoIS loses a match on extra time. This time against Ängelholms FF on Ängelholms IP in the Scanian derby with 1-2.
 14 September 2013: BoIS wins with 4-1 against Hammarby IF on Landskrona IP, with a hattrick scored by Fredrik Olsson.
 21 October 2013: After heavy protests from the fans, the Landskrona BoIS board decides to draw back their decision on switching from natural to artificial turf on Landskrona IP.
 21 October 2013: Landskrona BoIS loses their fifth match in a row.
 24 October 2013: Landskrona BoIS suspends the defender Liridon Leçi and goalkeeper Bill Halvorsen from further play, with suspicions that the players have been bribed to influence the team's performances negatively.
 2 November 2013: Landskrona BoIS secures their place in Superettan 2014 by drawing 0-0 at home with GIF Sundsvall. Reserve goalkeeper Niklas Uddenäs becomes the hero of the day with a couple of high class saves.

Players

First-team squad
This section shows the squad as of the end of the 2013 season.

Youth players
This section shows youth players who made appearances in the first-team squad as of the end of the 2013 season.

Transfers

Winter 2012-13

In:

Out:

Summer 2013

In:

Out:

Squad stats
As of the end of the 2013 season.

* Player left the club mid-season

Goalscorers
The list is sorted by shirt number when total goals are equal and includes all competitive matches.

Club officials
This list shows the club officials as of the end of the 2013 season.

Organisation

Technical staff

Competitions

Superettan

League table

Results summary

Results by round

Matches
Kickoff times are in UTC+1.

Svenska Cupen

2012–13
The tournament continues from the 2012 season.

Kickoff times are in UTC+1.

Group stage

2013–14
The tournament continues into the 2014 season.
Kickoff times are in UTC+1.

Qualification stage

Non competitive

Pre-season
Kickoff times are in UTC+1 unless stated otherwise.

Footnotes

References

Landskrona BoIS seasons
Swedish football clubs 2013 season